The Ocean at the End is the eighth studio album by Canadian rock band The Tea Party, released in Canada and Australia on September 8, 2014. It was their first album after the band reunited in 2011. The album comes ten years after their previous album, Seven Circles (2004). It reached number 17 on the Canadian Albums Chart, and entered the ARIA Albums Chart at number 18.

Track listing

Personnel
Band
Jeff Burrows – drums, percussion, backing vocals
Stuart Chatwood – bass guitar, keyboards, harmonium, mandolin, acoustic guitar, backing vocals
Jeff Martin – guitar, acoustic guitar, Therevox, esraj, oud, bowed guitar, lead vocals

Guest musicians
 Ian Anderson – flute on "The Ocean at the End"
 Aline Morales, Maninho Costa, and Riquinho Fernandes – additional Brazilian percussion on "Brazil"
 Jamie Ashforth – harmonica on "The Cass Corridor"
 Jeff & the Craibettes – backing vocals on "The Cass Corridor"
 Lucky Oceans – pedal steel on "Black Roses"

Charts

References

2014 albums
The Tea Party albums
Anthem Records albums